East ꞌAreꞌare is a single-member constituency of the National Parliament of Solomon Islands. Established in 1976 when the Legislative Assembly was expanded from 24 to 38 seats, it is located on the island of Malaita.

List of MPs

Election results

2014

2012

2010

2006

2001

1997

1993

1992

1989

1984

1980

1976

References

Solomon Islands parliamentary constituencies
Legislative Assembly of the Solomon Islands constituencies
1976 establishments in the Solomon Islands
Constituencies established in 1976